Entrelobos (Spanish for "Among Wolves") is a 2010 Spanish-German adventure and drama film directed by Gerardo Olivares. It is based on the true story of feral child Marcos Rodríguez Pantoja.

Cast 
 Manuel Camacho - Marcos as a child
 Juan José Ballesta - Marcos as an adult
 Sancho Gracia - Atanasio
 Carlos Bardem - Ceferino
 Àlex Brendemühl - Balilla
 Dafne Fernández - Pizquilla
 Eduardo Gómez - Caragorda
 Luisa Martín - Isabel
 Antonio Dechent - sergeant
 Marcos Rodríguez Pantoja - himself

Accolades 
 2011: 25th Goya Awards, Manuel Camacho nominated for Best New Actor
 2011: White Camel Award, Sahara International Film Festival

See also 
 List of Spanish films of 2010

References

External links 
 

Films set in Spain
Films shot in Spain
Spanish adventure drama films
German adventure drama films
2010s Spanish films
2010s Spanish-language films
2010s German films